Zamakh wa Manwakh District is a large district of the Hadhramaut Governorate, Yemen. It is one of the largest districts in Yemen. As of 2003, the district had a population of 1,505 inhabitants.

References

Districts of Hadhramaut Governorate